Michael Corbett Shannon (born August 7, 1974) is an American actor, producer, musician, and theater director. He is a frequent collaborator with director Jeff Nichols, having appeared in Nichols' films Shotgun Stories (2007), Take Shelter (2011), Mud (2012), Midnight Special, and Loving (both 2016). Shannon received two Academy Award for Best Supporting Actor nominations, for Revolutionary Road (2008), and Nocturnal Animals (2016). He received Screen Actors Guild Award and Golden Globe Award nominations for his role in 99 Homes (2014). 

Shannon's film debut was in Groundhog Day (1993). He appeared in 8 Mile (2002), Bad Boys II (2003), Bug (2006), Before the Devil Knows You're Dead (2007), Bad Lieutenant: Port of Call New Orleans (2009), The Iceman (2012), Premium Rush (2012), The Night Before (2015), Elvis & Nixon (2016), The Shape of Water (2017), Knives Out (2019), Bullet Train (2022), and Amsterdam (2022). He played General Zod in the DC Extended Universe films Man of Steel (2013) and Batman v Superman: Dawn of Justice (2016) and will reprise the role in The Flash (2023).

Shannon made his Broadway debut in the 2012 play Grace.

In 2016, he starred as James Tyrone Jr. in the revival of Eugene O'Neill's Long Day's Journey into Night (2016), earning a Tony Award for Best Featured Actor in a Play nomination. His television roles include a role as Nelson Van Alden in the HBO period drama series Boardwalk Empire (2010–2014) for which he was nominated for three Screen Actors Guild Awards. He starred in Hulu's Nine Perfect Strangers (2021), and Showtime's George & Tammy (2022).

Early life
Shannon was born in Lexington, Kentucky, to Donald Sutherlin Shannon, an accounting professor at DePaul University, and Geraldine Hine, a lawyer. His paternal grandfather was entomologist Raymond Corbett Shannon.

After Shannon's parents divorced, he alternated time with them, living with his mother in Lexington, Kentucky,  and in Chicago, Illinois, with his father. He attended New Trier Township High School in Winnetka, Illinois, for two years before moving to a high school in Kentucky for his junior year. Shannon returned to Chicago for his senior year at Evanston Township High School where he dropped out after a semester.

Acting career
Shannon's first film role was the main character in the music video for the Every Mother's Nightmare song "House of Pain", where he played a troubled teenager who had run away from his abusive home. Shannon performed on stage in Chicago, where he helped found A Red Orchid Theatre. He worked with the Steppenwolf Theatre Company and Northlight Theatre. Shannon originated the role of Peter Evans in Bug in 1996 and starred in the 2006 film adaptation. His roles in Bug and Killer Joe were written by Steppenwolf ensemble member Tracy Letts.

In 1993, Shannon made his film debut in Groundhog Day as a wedding groom. He had roles in Jesus' Son, Pearl Harbor, 8 Mile, Vanilla Sky, Kangaroo Jack, Bad Boys II, and a role in Grand Theft Parsons as hippie Larry Oster-Berg.

Shannon appeared in Let's Go to Prison in 2006, where he portrayed Lynard, the leader of a prison white supremacist group. He  appeared in a production of Woyzeck in the West End in London. In 2008, Shannon was featured in the off-Broadway production of Stephen Adly Guirgis's The Little Flower of East Orange, presented by LAByrinth Theater Company and The Public Theater, directed by Philip Seymour Hoffman.

In 2008, he starred in the romantic drama film Revolutionary Road, alongside Leonardo DiCaprio and Kate Winslet. His performance as the clinically insane son earned him universal acclaim, and won the Satellite Award for Best Supporting Actor – Motion Picture and received an Academy Award nomination for Best Supporting Actor. In 2010, he portrayed Doc Cross Williams in the film adaptation of Jonah Hex. Shannon played Federal Prohibition agent Nelson Van Alden in the HBO television show Boardwalk Empire, which began in 2010. In November of that year, he began starring in the one man play Mistakes Were Made at the Barrow Street Theatre in New York City, with performances having run through February 27, 2012. Shannon had performed the show in 2009 at A Red Orchid Theatre in Chicago.

In 2011, Shannon starred in the drama film Take Shelter. He received rave reviews for his performance, and a Saturn Award for Best Actor. In 2012, he played a corrupt cop in the film Premium Rush, written and directed by David Koepp, and appeared on Broadway along with Paul Rudd and Ed Asner in Grace written by Craig Wright. In 2013, he starred as legendary mob hitman Richard Kuklinski in The Iceman, which was distributed in May 2013. Also in 2013, Shannon portrayed General Zod, the main antagonist in Zack Snyder's film Man of Steel. Shannon portrayed music icon Elvis Presley alongside Kevin Spacey as President Richard Nixon in Elvis & Nixon.

In 2015, he performed in the biographical drama Freeheld, and the independent drama 99 Homes, as housing agent Rick Carver, a role that earned him nominations for the Golden Globe Award for Best Supporting Actor – Motion Picture and the Screen Actors Guild Award for Outstanding Performance by a Male Actor in a Supporting Role. Shannon played Mr. Green in The Night Before in 2015.

Shannon starred in the 2016 psychological thriller film Nocturnal Animals, with Amy Adams and Jake Gyllenhaal. His performance as a detective investigating a double homicide garnered him critical acclaim and a second nomination for the Academy Award for Best Supporting Actor.

In 2017, Shannon played Col. Richard Strickland in Guillermo del Toro's romantic fantasy film The Shape of Water. The film premiered at the 74th Venice International Film Festival, where it won the Golden Lion.

Shannon played the lead role as Gary Noesner in Waco on Paramount Network in 2018. He appeared in Long Way Back Home, an extended film clip for the song of the same name by Memphis country-punk rock band, Lucero, from its album Among The Ghosts. Lucero's frontman, Ben Nichols, is the older brother of frequent Shannon collaborator, Jeff Nichols. Shannon contributed spoken world vocals to Lucero's "Back To The Night", also from Among The Ghosts.

In 2019, Shannon joined an ensemble cast in Rian Johnson's mystery film Knives Out, portraying Walt Thrombey.

In 2021, Shannon played Napoleon Marconi in the Hulu miniseries Nine Perfect Strangers, based on the novel of the same name by Liane Moriarty.

Shannon is reprising his role as General Zod in the film The Flash, to be released by Warner Bros. in 2023.

In April 2022, a follow-up series to Waco, titled American Tragedies: Waco – The Trials was announced and was set to premiere on Paramount+ in 2023. It centers on the fallout from the Waco siege as well as the emerging patriot movement. In February 2023, the series was retitled Waco: The Aftermath and would instead premiere on Showtime on April 16, 2023. Shannon also serves as a executive producer for the show.

Music career
In 2002, Shannon formed the indie rock band Corporal with Ray Rizzo and Rob Beitzel. Shannon sings and writes lyrics for the band. In 2010, Corporal released its self-titled debut album.

The first track "Glory" was released in 2011 and the second song, "Obama," was released in June 2012 as the band's endorsement of President Obama's run for reelection.

Personal life
Shannon married actress Kate Arrington in 2018, whom he had dated since 2002. They have two daughters, one born in 2008 and the other in 2011. They live in the neighborhood of Red Hook located in the New York City borough of Brooklyn.

Filmography

Film

Television

Theater

Awards and nominations

See also
 List of actors with Academy Award nominations

Notes

References

External links

 Corporal (band website)
 
 
 

1974 births
20th-century American male actors
21st-century American male actors
Actors from Lexington, Kentucky
American male film actors
American male stage actors
American male television actors
Living people
Male actors from Kentucky
People from Red Hook, Brooklyn
Drama Desk Award winners